Lhuillier, L'Huillier or Luillier is a surname. Notable people with the surname include:

Alberto Ruz Lhuillier (1906–1979) Mexican archaeologist
Beatriz Lucero Lhuillier, wife of Jean Henri Lhuillier, Filipino winner of the 1992 Olympics bronze medal in taekwondo
Jean Henri Lhuillier, son of Philippe Jones Lhuillier; Filipino entrepreneur
Philippe Jones Lhuillier, Filipino Ambassador to Portugal
Monique Lhuillier, Filipino fashion designer
Marie Françoise L'Huillier de La Serre, French aristocrat and first wife of Jean-Baptiste Berthier (1721–1804)
 Victor Gustave Lhuillier (1844–1889), French engraver and etcher
Waldeck L'Huillier (1905-1986), a French politician

See also
Fort L'Huillier, a former fort in Minnesota, US, named for Rémy-François L'Huillier
Brand & L'Huillier, an armsdealer and manufacturer of the 12 cm Luftminenwerfer M 16 during World War I
Cebuana Lhuillier, a pawnbroking business in the Philippines